Alur also spelled as Alooru is a town and the taluk headquarters of Alur Taluk in Hassan district in the state of Karnataka, India. It is 14 km from Hassan City. Alur town is offset by 2 kms from NH-75. Alur has a railway station, named "Alur Halt", located on Mangalore-Hassan line. But no train stops at this station.

Demography 
As per 2001 census, Alur has a population of 4961.

Gallery

See also
Ajjenahalli, Alur

References

Cities and towns in Hassan district